Marsha Courneya is a Canadian screenwriter, best known for her work on the feature film The Blue Seal.

External links

21st-century Canadian screenwriters
Living people
Year of birth missing (living people)
Place of birth missing (living people)
Canadian women screenwriters
21st-century Canadian women writers